The Ley trans is a 2023 law that permits gender self-identification in Spain. The law allows for free change of legal sex for people over 16 years, while requiring parent authorisation for people over 14 years and judge approval for those over 12. It also bans efforts to change people's gender expression, sexual orientation or sexual identity through conversion therapy. The law also covers other aspects of LGBTI rights. The law does not allow people to switch to a nonbinary gender, which does not exist in Spanish law.

Prior history 
The Andalusian autonomous government passed a gender self-identification (self-ID) law as early as 2014. It was proposed by the Asociación de Transexuales de Andalucía (ATA) Sylvia Rivera. 15 other Spanish autonomous communities passed self-ID laws before the Ley trans was passed on the national level.

On the national level, the political confederation of Unidas Podemos, En Comú Podem, and En Marea on 23 February 2018 made a legal proposal for a self-ID law in the Spanish lower house, the Congress of Deputies. The proposal, titled , was also supported by the Federación Plataforma Trans. It included the rights to

 self-identification for over-16-year-olds,
 a change possible to female, male and nonbinary gender,
 hormonal treatment without parental consent, or otherwise, the support of a legal defender.

The proposal provided for these rights to be without medical or psychological assessment, and without undergoing medical, surgical or other treatments.

History of the law

Government plans and gridlock 
The 2019 coalition agreement of the second government of Pedro Sánchez (Spain's 14th legislature) provided for the introduction of gender self-identification (self-ID). The coalition was formed by a triple alliance of Unidas Podemos, En Comú Podem (which co-sponsored the previous proposal), and Galicia en Común, and the Socialist Workers' Party, which received the most seats of the four parties. In 2020, at the beginning of the legislative period, the Ministry of Equality led by Irene Montero stated that it would develop a self-ID law. However, some Socialists such as Carmen Calvo blocked the law.

On 10 March 2021, Mar Cambrollé, president of the Federación Plataforma Trans, led a hunger strike of over 70 trans people and mothers of underage trans people. Two days into the strike, the parliamentary groups of Esquerra Republicana de Catalunya (ERC), Más País, Candidatura d'Unitat Popular (CUP) and Compromís registered a joint law proposition it would pursue if the government did not advance its trans law proposal at the Council of Ministers on 23 March 2021. This ended the strike.

Government draft 
It was supported by the Federación Plataforma Trans. On 18 March 2021, the law was refused treatment by a vote with No votes coming from right-wing parties Vox and Partido Popular, and abstention from the Socialist Workers' Party. This led the Federación Plataforma Trans to renew its call for unblocking the legal process, and for a boycott of Madrid Pride if no progress could be reached. This led to the exclusion of Carmen Calvo from the parliamentary negotiations.

On 29 June 2021, the Ministry of Equality presented to the Council of Ministers its draft for the Ley trans. The document provided for gender self-ID for anyone over 16 years.

On 27 June 2022, the bill returned to the Council of Ministers, which approved it, so it became a legal project. This was the final, more version of gender self-ID, which was more liberal compared to the original draft: self-ID was to be possible from 14 years with parental or guardian consent, and freely from 16 years. A gender change from 12 to 14 years of age was to be possible with judicial authorisation only.

First reading in the Congress 

The draft was approved at first reading on 21 December 2022, with 188 votes in favour, 150 opposed, and 7 abstentions. The abstentions included Carmen Calvo, and three other Socialist deputies.

Approval in the Senate 
The Spanish upper house, the Senate, debated the law from 20 January 2023. The Socialist Workers' Union reaffirmed its intention not to request modifications to the law.

The law passed the Senate on 9 February 2023 with 144 Yes votes, 108 No votes, and 2 abstentions.

Second and final reading in the Congress 
The Ley trans passed its final voting phase in the Congress on 16 February 2023. It was made law with 191 votes in favour, 60 against, and 91 abstentions.

External links 

 2 March 2018 draft: Proposición de Ley sobre la protección jurídica de las personas trans y el derecho a la libre determinación de la identidad sexual y expresión de género
 26 March 2021 draft: Proposición de Ley para la igualdad real y efectiva de las personas trans
 12 September 2022 draft: Proyecto de Ley para la igualdad real y efectiva de las personas trans y para la garantía de los derechos de las personas LGTBI

References 

2023 in LGBT history
LGBT in Spain
Transgender law